John William Hayes (April 27, 1910 – November 16, 1988) was an American Negro league catcher from 1934 to 1951.

A native of Independence, Missouri, Hayes served in the US Army during World War II. He was selected to play in the East–West All-Star Game in 1947 and 1951. Hayes died in Auburn Park, Illinois in 1988 at age 78.

References

External links
 and Seamheads

1910 births
1988 deaths
Baltimore Elite Giants players
New York Black Yankees players
Newark Dodgers players
Newark Eagles players
20th-century African-American sportspeople
Baseball catchers
United States Army personnel of World War II